This is a list of some drum makers, individuals and companies known for making drums and accessories, such as drum sticks. It includes defunct companies, and companies who additionally make instruments other than drums, and manufacturers of cymbals, which are a common component of drum sets.



A 
Adams Musical Instruments
Alesis
American Drum Manufacturing Company
Avedis Zildjian Company (AKA Zildjian)
Axis Percussion
Ayotte Drums

B
Brady Drum Company

C
Camco Drum Company
Conn-Selmer
Cooperman Fife and Drum Company
Corder Drum Company
Cumbus

D
D'Addario
Ddrum
Dixon Drums
Drum Workshop (DW)

E
E-MU Systems
Evans

F
Fibes Drums

G
Gibraltar Hardware
Gretsch Drums

H
Harmony Company
Hayman drum
Hohner

J
John Grey & Sons
Jupiter Band Instruments

K
Gregg Keplinger
KHS Musical Instruments
King Conga

L
Latin Percussion
Leedy Manufacturing Company
Walter Light
Ludwig Drums

M
Majestic Percussion
Mapex Drums
Meinl Percussion

N
Natal Drums
Noble & Cooley
North Drums

O
Orange County Drum and Percussion

P
Pacific Drums and Percussion
Paiste
Pearl Drums
Peavey Electronics
Pork Pie Percussion
Premier Percussion
Pro-Mark

R
Remo
Rogers Drums
Roland Corporation

S
Sabian
Simmons
Slingerland Drum Company
Sonor
Soultone Cymbals

T
Tama Drums
Trixon Drums

U
UFIP

V
Vater Percussion
Vic Firth Company

Y
Yamaha Drums

Z
Zendrum
Zildjian

.
Drum